Conopomorpha oceanica is a moth of the family Gracillariidae. It is known from Fiji and Vanuatu.

The larvae feed on Theobroma cacao. They probably mine the leaves as well as the fruit or seeds of their host plant.

References

Conopomorpha
Moths described in 1986